Chase is an unincorporated community in Grant Township, Benton County, in the U.S. state of Indiana.  Though virtually extinct, Chase still persists on state and county maps and retains a single business in the form of grain elevators operated by Boswell Chase Grain, Inc. A few miles away is the Daughtery Motor Speedway.

History
A post office was established at Chase in 1873, and remained in operation until it was discontinued in 1918. The community was named for Simon P. Chase.

Geography
Indiana State Road 352 and the Kankakee, Beaverville and Southern Railroad both go west through the town.

References

External links

Unincorporated communities in Benton County, Indiana
Unincorporated communities in Indiana
Lafayette metropolitan area, Indiana
1873 establishments in Indiana
Populated places established in 1873